Cupuladria is a genus of bryozoans in the suborder Flustrina.

References

External links 

 

Bryozoan genera
Cheilostomatida
Paleogene invertebrates
Neogene invertebrates
Quaternary invertebrates
Extant Paleogene first appearances
Prehistoric bryozoan genera
Paleogene genus first appearances